Spring House is a historic inn located at Pittsford in Monroe County, New York. It is a - to -story brick building constructed into a hillside that, at the time, overlooked the Erie Canal.  (The canal has long since been rerouted to the south.)  The structure dates to 1832 and was built as a health spa located at Monroe Springs, a set of sulphur springs. It serves as a restaurant on busy Monroe Avenue.

It was listed on the National Register of Historic Places in 1975.

References

Hotel buildings on the National Register of Historic Places in New York (state)
Hotel buildings completed in 1832
Buildings and structures in Monroe County, New York
National Register of Historic Places in Monroe County, New York